Durga Temple of Virginia is a Hindu Temple located in Lorton, Virginia and serves the Hindu population within in the Washington DC Metropolitan Area. In 2010, the temple served 6500 Hindus residing in Fairfax County.

History
In 1991, The Durga Temple was established as a religious organization for Northern Virginia. In 1996, work began on constructing the Hindu Temple. It was financed with a 2.5 million Dollar loan from First Virginia Bank (now part of Truist Financial). In October 1996, Bhoomi Pooja was held to celebrate the groundbreaking ceremony. The Temple was complete on March 21 1999. The Durga Temple held a "Hinduism Summit" to educate people on Hinduism, The Struggle of Hindus, Hindu History and to change the perception of Hindus in America. The temple also offers Indian Cultural Classes, Spiritual classes and a Boy Scouts Program.

References

1999 establishments in Virginia
 Buildings and structures in Fairfax County, Virginia
Hinduism in the United States
Religious buildings and structures completed in 1999
Religious organizations established in 1991
Indian-American culture in Virginia
Asian-American culture in Virginia